The Medal of Honor is the United States of America's highest military honor.

Medal of Honor or Medal of Honour may also refer to:

Awards

National Honours
 Medal of Honour (Hong Kong)
 Medal of Honour, the fifth-highest honour of the orders, decorations, and medals of Monaco
 Medals of Honor (Japan), different Japanese medals, each individually known as a Medal of Honor in English
Military Medal of Honor (Japan)
 Pingat Kehormatan, (English: Medal of Honour) in Singapore
 Congressional Space Medal of Honor
 Turkish Armed Forces Medal of Honor

Other awards
 Belisario Domínguez Medal of Honor (Mexico)
 Cardenas Medal of Honor (United States)
 Confederate Medal of Honor (Sons of Confederate Veterans)
 Ellis Island Medal of Honor (National Ethnic Coalition of Organizations)
 IEEE Medal of Honor (Institute of Electrical and Electronics Engineers)
 New York City Police Department Medal of Honor (City of New York)
 Photoplay Medal of Honor (Photoplay magazine)
 Texas Legislative Medal of Honor (State of Texas)
 Victoria Medal of Honour (Royal Horticultural Society)

Television 
 Medal of Honor (documentary), a 2018 documentary miniseries about eight American soldiers who were awarded the medal

Films 
 Medal of Honor (film), 2009 Romanian film

Video games
 Medal of Honor (series), a video game series
 Medal of Honor (1999 video game), the first game in the series
 Medal of Honor (2010 video game), a reboot of the series
 Medal of Honor (soundtrack), a soundtrack album from the 2010 game

Other
 Medal of Honor (comics), American comic book series (1994–95)

See also
 Galactic Medal of Honour, 1976 novel by Mack Reynolds

 
 

Medals